Parmotrema barioense is a species of corticolous lichen in the family Parmeliaceae. The holotype specimen was collected in a Kerangas forest in Sarawak, Malaysia. It contains the secondary compounds atranorin, chloroatranorin, protocetraric acid, and butlerin derivatives. The lichen resembles Parmotrema zollingeri, but can be distinguished from that species by the older, convoluted lobes in the centre of the thallus, the larger ascospores, and the presence of butlerins.

See also
List of Parmotrema species

References

barioense
Lichen species
Lichens described in 1997
Lichens of Malaysia
Taxa named by John Alan Elix